The first USS Ostrich (SP-1249) was a United States Navy patrol vessel in commission from 1917 to 1919.

Ostrich was built as a private motorboat of the same name in 1909 in by the Electric Launch Company (ELCO) at Bayonne, New Jersey, for Nathan Strauss, Jr. On 20 July 1917, the U.S. Navy acquired her on loan from her owner for use as a section patrol boat during World War I. She was commissioned on 25 October 1917 as USS Ostrich (SP-1249).

Assigned to the 3rd Naval District, Ostrich carried out patrol duties for the rest of World War I.

The Navy decommissioned Ostrich on 23 December 1918 and returned her to her owner the same day.

References

SP-1239 Ostrich at Department of the Navy Naval History and Heritage Command Online Library of Selected Images: U.S. Navy Ships -- Listed by Hull Number "SP" #s and "ID" #s -- World War I Era Patrol Vessels and other Acquired Ships and Craft numbered from SP-1200 through SP-1299
NavSource Online: Section Patrol Craft Photo Archive Ostrich (SP 1239)

Patrol vessels of the United States Navy
World War I patrol vessels of the United States
Ships built in Bayonne, New Jersey
1909 ships